Jonathan Oliver Darcy Orders (born 12 August 1957) is an English born former cricketer who has played for Hong Kong.

A left-handed batsman and left-arm medium pace bowler, he played 27 first-class matches, mostly for Oxford University, between 1978 and 1981 and three List A matches for a Combined Universities team in the Benson and Hedges Cup in the same period.

He also played for the Kent second XI twice in 1978, and represented Hong Kong at the 1994 ICC Trophy.

References

1957 births
Living people
Alumni of Trinity College, Oxford
British Universities cricketers
Cricketers from Beckenham
English cricketers
Hong Kong cricketers
Oxford and Cambridge Universities cricketers
Oxford University cricketers